Methylisothiazolinone, MIT, or MI, is the organic compound with the formula S(CH)2C(O)NCH3. It is a white solid. Isothiazolinones, a class of heterocycles, are used as biocides in numerous personal care products and other industrial applications. MIT and related compounds have attracted much attention for their allergenic properties, e.g. contact dermatitis.

Preparation 
It is prepared by cyclization of cis-N-methyl-3-thiocyanoacrylamide:
 NCSCH=CHC(O)NHCH3 -> SCH=CHC(O)NCH3 + HCN

Applications 

Methylisothiazolinone is used for controlling microbial growth in water-containing solutions. It is typically used in a formulation with 5-chloro-2-methyl-4-isothiazolin-3-one (CMIT), in a 3:1 mixture (CMIT:MIT) sold commercially as Kathon. Kathon is supplied to manufacturers as a concentrated stock solution containing from 1.5–15% of CMIT/MIT.
Kathon also has been used to control slime in the manufacture of paper products that contact food. In addition, this product serves as an antimicrobial agent in latex adhesives and in paper coatings that also contact food.

Hazards 
MIT is allergenic and cytotoxic, and this has led to some concern over its use. A report released by the European Scientific Committee on Cosmetic Products and Non-food Products Intended for Consumers (SCCNFP) in 2003 also concluded that insufficient information was available to allow for an adequate risk assessment analysis of MIT.

Rising reports of consumer impact led to new research, including a report released in 2014 by the European Commission Scientific Committee on Consumer Safety which reported: 
"The dramatic rise in the rates of reported cases of contact allergy to MI, as detected by diagnostic patch tests, is unprecedented in Europe; there have been repeated warnings about the rise. The increase is primarily caused by increasing consumer exposure to MI from cosmetic products; exposures to MI in household products, paints and in the occupational setting also need to be considered. The delay in re-evaluation of the safety of MI in cosmetic products is of concern to the SCCS; it has adversely affected consumer safety." The American Contact Dermatitis Society named methylisothiazolinone “contact allergen of the year” in 2013. The North American Contact Dermatitis Group found that methylisothiazolinone caused 10.9% positive reactions, being the third most common contact allergen in patch test results which surveyed close to 5000 contact dermatitis patients. Additionally, new research into cross reactivity of MIT-sensitized patients to variants benzisothiazolinone and octylisothiazolinone have found that reactions may occur if present in sufficient amounts.

Regulation 
In 2014, the European Commission Scientific Committee on Consumer Safety further issued a voluntary ban on the MCI/MI mixture from leave-on products such as body creams. The measure applied for products placed on the market after 16 July 2015." Shortly thereafter, Canada moved to adopt similar measures in its Cosmetic Ingredients Hotlist.

Based on the opinion of the Scientific Committee on Consumer Safety (SCCS) of 2013, Commission Regulation (EU) 2016/1198 of 22 July 2016 amending Annex V to Regulation (EC) No 1223/2009 of the European Parliament and of the Council on cosmetic products banned the use of methylisothiazolinone in leave-on products (skin creams and lotions) effective 12 February 2017 and limited it to 0.01% in rinse-off products (e.g. shampoo). Effective 27 January 2018 (placing on the market), the maximum concentration in rinse-off products was reduced to 0.0015%.

References

External links 
 CMIT/MIT Assessment
 2014 EPA Re-registration Review Docket with Public Commentary
 Reregistration Eligibility Decision of MIT by US EPA
 
 Material Safety Data Sheet for product containing 0.1-1% MIT
 Commission Scientific Committee on Consumer Safety Opinion on Methylisothiazolinone (P94) Submission II (Sensitization only) SCCS/1521/13
 Methylisothiazolinone at the National Library of Medicine
 2014 EPA Re-registration Review Docket with Public Commentary
 Photo album of self reported reactions to methylisothiazolinone

Preservatives
Isothiazolidinones